Syncro may refer to:
4motion, a line of Volkswagen cars formerly called "Syncro"
Fly Synthesis Syncro, an Italian ultralight aircraft
Windtech Syncro, a Spanish paraglider design
Syncro-Synergy Croatia, a Croatian society
SyncroMSP, an information technology software platform

See also

synchro